Pod Save the World is a weekly American foreign policy podcast produced and distributed by Crooked Media, and hosted by former White House National Security Council spokesman Tommy Vietor and former Deputy National Security Advisor Ben Rhodes. In each episode, Vietor and Rhodes discuss foreign policy and international relations. The last 20–30 minutes of the episode, one of the hosts interviews a guest, usually a foreign policy expert or former government official. Notable guests have included former National Security Advisor Susan Rice, former White House Chief of Staff Denis McDonough, and US Senator and vice presidential candidate Tim Kaine.

While other Crooked Media podcasts tend to focus heavily on domestic issues within the United States, Pod Save the World discusses global issues and international relations, with a focus on civic involvement. Vietor describes the podcast as a "no bullshit" approach to global news that tries to make complicated issues seem relatable and simple to understand.

The podcast regularly is joined by journalists, activists, politicians, entertainers, and world leaders. Some of their best-known guests include former US President Barack Obama, current US President Joe Biden, and WNBA player and activist Renee Montgomery. 

They promote political activism and encourage democracy through various platforms but their key initiative is Vote Save America. They are closely related to other Crooked Media podcasts such as Lovett or Leave It hosted by Jon Lovett.

Reception 
It debuted at number two on the iTunes podcast chart on February 1, 2017. Salon named Pod Save the World as one of its "15 indispensable policy podcasts". Vogue called it one of spring 2017's best shows.

See also 
 Pod Save America
 Political podcast

References

External links 
 

2017 podcast debuts
American podcasts
Audio podcasts
Crooked Media
Political podcasts
Liberal podcasts